William or Bill Ash may refer to:
William Ash (MP) (died 1411), English Member of Parliament for Dorchester in 1394
William H. Ash (1859–1908), American former slave and member of the Virginia House of Delegates
Bill Ash (1917–2014), American-born British writer, Marxist, and World War II RCAF pilot
Bill Ash (basketball), American professional basketball player in the 1940s
William Ash (actor) (born 1977), British actor

See also
William Ashe (disambiguation)